The NS 3851–3855 was a series of locomotives was in service at the Dutch Railways shortly after the Second World War. They were originally German locomotives.

History 
As a successor to the P6, the Prussian P8 was developed by Robert Hermann Garbe. The locomotive was built by the Berliner Machinenbau AG and was intended for the Königlich Preußische Staatseisenbahnen (K.P.St.E.). The first locomotives initially showed some weaknesses, such as wrongly dimensioned connecting rods and a tender that ensured that the locomotive could not run faster than 45 km/h backwards. Over the years, various adjustments were made to the P8, such as the use of a DB tender (wannentender) for the P8, which greatly improved the running characteristics of the locomotive backwards and which was now able to achieve a speed of 85 km/h running in reverse. (the Dutch locomotives had no wannentenders).

Service with the NS 
Five locomotives entered service with the NS in 1945 because many Dutch locomotives were taken or destroyed by the Germans in World War II. They were classified as the series NS 3850. They were numbered 3851 to 3855.

All locomotives were returned to Germany in 1947.

Gallery

Sources 
 H. Waldorp: Onze Nederlandse stoomlocomotieven in woord en beeld, (7e druk) uitgeverij De Alk, Alkmaar, 1986. .
 Het Utrchts Archief

Rolling stock of the Netherlands
Steam locomotives of the Netherlands
Steam locomotives of Germany
4-6-0 locomotives
Humboldt locomotives
Berliner locomotives
Henschel locomotives
Linke-Hofmann locomotives